De natura rerum ("on the nature of things") is a treatise by the Anglo-Saxon monk Bede, composed in 703 as a companion-piece to his De temporibus ('on times'). In the view of Eoghan Ahern, 'though it is an early work that does not approach the complexity and innovation of Bede's later thought, DNR provides us with an insight into the cosmological assumptions that undergird his understanding of theology and history'.

Contents

The work comprises fifty-one short chapters with titles such as:

 De Quadrifario dei opere (on the fourfold work of God)
 De mundi formatione (on the formation of the earth)
 Quid sit mundus (what the world is)
 De elementis (on the elements)
 De firmamento (on heaven)
 De varia altitudine cœli (on the differing height of the sky)
 De cœlo superiore (on the upper sky)
 De aquis cœlestibus (on the celestial waters)
 De quinque circulis mundi (on the five circles of the earth)
 De plagis mundi (on the climes of the earth)
 De stellis (on the stars)
 De cursu planetarum (on the course of the planets)
 De ordine eorum (on their arrangement)

For example, chapter 3, 'Quid sit mundus' ('what the world is') runs:

Translations
 Bede, On the Nature of Things and On Times, trans. by Calvin B. Kendall and Faith Wallis, Translated Texts for Historians, 56 (Liverpool: Liverpool University Press, 2010),

References

Works by Bede
8th-century Latin books
703
8th century in England